Matador is one of the most prominent figures of underground Hip Hop in Senegal. Founding member of the Thiaroye’s group, WA BMG 44, Matador has toured throughout the world gaining an international recognition from the underground hip hop scenes abroad. Since 2006, his struggle to represent the voiceless youth of his home country has taken a renewed turn with the creation of his structure, Africulturban in Pikine.  Through this space dedicated to the youth, Matador reiterates his social and political engagement while pursuing his role of “Number One System Enemy” and “General Major Chief of the Dying People Army”.

Biography 

Matador, aka Xarale made his first steps in Hip Hop in 1984 as a dancer ; he was then 12 years old. It is only in 1992, that Matador, of his real name Babacar Niang, creates with two of his school friends, Mokhtar and Gueye (Omar) – where “BMG” initials come from – the group which later will be called Wa BMG 44. BMG soon comes to represent the whole neighbourhood of Thiaroye, having all the young people from this Dakar’s banlieue following and coming to support its crew each time they were performing. With respect, Wa BMG was one of the most energetic performers of Hip Hop Galsen. Before the release of their first production in 1998, the group then added to its name the number 44 in memory of the Senegalese Tirailleurs shot in Thiaroye, on December, 1st 1944, by the French colonial army after having demanded compensations for their active participation in the French army during the second world war. Nowadays, the name Wa BMG 44 is often interpreted as “Wa Bokk Menmen Guestu” which in wolof literally means "All together to think better".

After their first release “Def Ci Yaw” which furiously spoke out against Senegalese government corruption and thievery, Wa BMG 44 tours throughout Europe slowly building a name for itself inside the wider underground hip hop community. In 2002, during a trip organised in Brussels, the group meets with the rapper and producer SMIMOOZ, with whom they record a year later the compilation "BXL-DAKAR des millions de mikes à parcourir" featuring rappers from Brussels like Pasco, Vagabond, Uman, Pitcho, Lady N & Catseyes as well as the group Pee Froiss from Dakar. In 2004, Wa BMG 44 pursues its impressive ascension and definitively imposed itself as one of the most respected figures of Hip Hop Galsen. After recording their classic hip-hop anthem "44" on African Underground Vol.1, they go back in studio in Belgium and work on their highly anticipated second full length release. This album, called "44 4 Life" comes out in 2004 scoring a nationwide hit with the first single "Jox Ma Sa 5". For the summer tour of this second album, Wa BMG welcomes the female MC Fatim who, since then, has become 44's first lady of honour.

Intensively touring throughout Europe, Matador comes back more permanently to Dakar in 2005 in order to release, in 2007, his first solo album, allying rap and slam. Since its release, “Xippil Xoll” has been hugely acclaimed by the Senegalese audience. Still resolutely militant, Matador initiates in November 2009 his Xippil Xol Fagarou Tour through which he aims at raising public awareness on HIV/AIDS prevention. He is then joined on stage by Simon, Fou Malade, Tigrim Bi, Wa Keur Gui, Syndikate 21, 5Kiem Underground, Sen Kumpe, Alien Zik, La Section B, One X and other artists of Hip Hop Galsen. After the devastating flooding which occurred in September 2009 in Dakar, Matador releases a new music video in support of the impacted Senegalese population. ‘Catastrophe’ is a song which was recorded over a beat by AfricanHipHop radio DJ Threesixty.

Following the 2005 flooding which completely destroyed the Thiaroye’s neighbourhood where he grew up, Matador tried to organise a huge concert with many Senegalese musicians in order to support the victims of this catastrophe. A year later, with the only support of the Pikine’s Mayor and the director of its cultural centre, Matador was able to create his structure, Africulturban, a cultural space dedicated to the urban youth. Africulturban is thus a hip hop association which hosts a recording studio as well as a radio, organises since 2006 a festival, Festa2H, initiates several projects such as “Hip Hop Education” which intervenes in elementary schools and which has created a DJ school, “African Turntablism” animated by Pee Froiss DJ, Gee Bayss. With his structure, Matador really contributes in offering to the youth at the peripheries of the Senegalese capital a space which is theirs and where their dreams can come true. Africulturban is also an active member of the organising committee of “72H Hip Hop”.

Discography 

1998 – Def ci Yaw
 2003 – BXL-DAKAR: des millions de mikes a parcourir (Compilation with SMIMOOZ)
 2004 – 44 4 Life (Senegal release only)
 2007 – Xippil Xoll (“Seeing with Eyes Wide Open”)
 2012 - Vox Populi ( La voix du peuple/Voice of the People )

Distinctions / Affiliations 

 2004 – Best Single and Best Album – Hip Hop Awards (Dakar, Senegal)
 2009 – Best Hip Hop and R&B Artist – Sunu Music Awards (Dakar, Senegal)
 2010 – Representative of Senegal at Hip Hop Kankpe Festival (Cotonou, Benin)

See also 
 Hip Hop Galsen

References

External links 

 Xippil Xol music video 
 Festa 2H Festival 

Senegalese hip hop musicians
Living people
Year of birth missing (living people)